Shrewsbury is a civil parish in Shropshire, England.  It contains nearly 800 listed buildings that are recorded in the National Heritage List for England.  Of these, 14 are listed at Grade I, the highest of the three grades, 71 are at Grade II*, the middle grade, and the others are at Grade II, the lowest grade.

Shrewsbury is the county town of Shropshire, it is a market town and the commercial centre for the county and for mid-Wales.  It stands on the River Severn, and  its centre is almost surrounded by a large curve in the river.  The oldest substantial surviving buildings in the town are Shrewsbury Castle and Shrewsbury Abbey, together with a number of churches and the town walls.  The town flourished commercially during the 13th century, mainly from the wool trade, and a number of friaries were founded.  Two major bridges were built, the Welsh Bridge at the north of the town, linking its centre with the suburb of Frankwell, and the English Bridge to the east, linking with the abbey and the suburb of Abbey Foregate.  Following a decline in fortune during the 15th century, trade revived during the in the later 16th century, mainly from Welsh cloth, and impressive houses were built, most of which were timber framed.  There was particular growth during the 18th century, when more impressive properties and public buildings were constructed, now in brick.  A public park was created on the site of a former quarry, and named appropriately The Quarry.  There was little heavy industry in the town, but at the end of the 18th century Ditherington Flax Mill was built, the first fully iron-framed building in the world.  At the same time, the Shrewsbury Canal was opened, and the railway arrived in the town in 1848.  There was further development during the 19th century in the town centre and the suburbs.  Shrewsbury School, originally a grammar school in the town centre, moved to a new site south of the river in 1882, and has become an independent school.  During the 20th century there has been continuing development in and around the town.

Due to the large number of listed buildings, they have been divided into three lists, based on geographical areas.  The central area of the town is almost surrounded by the river, and this has been split into two lists, divided by the roads running from the southwest to the northeast, named respectively St John's Hill, Shoplatch, Pride Hill, Castle Street, Castle Gates, and Castle Foregate.  The other list contains the listed buildings in the areas outside the central area.  This list contains the listed buildings on the named roads and in the area to the northwest of these.  Most of these are houses and associated structures, public houses and hotels, shops and offices.  The two Grade I listed buildings are the Library, originally Shrewsbury Grammar School, and St Chad's Church.  The church overlooks The Quarry, in and around which are a number of listed structures.


Key

Buildings

See also
Listed buildings in Shrewsbury (southeast central area)
Listed buildings in Shrewsbury (outer areas)

References

Citations

Sources

z

See also
Listed buildings in Shrewsbury (southeast central area)
Listed buildings in Shrewsbury (outer areas)

Lists of buildings and structures in Shropshire
Buildings and structures in Shrewsbury